A Woronin body (named after the Russian botanist Mikhail Stepanovich Woronin) is a peroxisome-derived, dense core microbody with a unit membrane found near the septae that divide hyphal compartments in filamentous Ascomycota. One established function of Woronin bodies is the plugging of the septal pores after hyphal wounding, which restricts the
loss of cytoplasm to the sites of injury.

References

Cell biology
Articles containing video clips